Sibi Kuroto Forest Park  is a forest park in the Gambia. Established on January 1, 1954, it covers 174 hectares. 

It is located in the Upper River region at an altitude of six meters.

References

Protected areas established in 1954
Forest parks of the Gambia